Kiril Kotev (born 18 April 1982) is a Bulgarian former professional footballer who played as a defender.

Club career
In his youth years, Kotev started to play football at Vihar Gorublyane. At the age of 16 he moved to Velbazhd Kyustendil. In 2002 Kotev signed with Lokomotiv Plovdiv, with whom he became a Champion of Bulgaria and holder of Bulgarian Supercup in 2004. In the same year he made his debut for the Bulgaria national football team.

In January 2005, CSKA Sofia signed Kotev to a four-year deal for €100,000. After the departure of Aleksandar Tunchev and Valentin Iliev in the summer of 2008, he started to play a lot more regularly showing his great abilities, great sense for marking and also scoring some important goals for the club.

On 5 June 2013, Kotev signed with Cherno More. He quickly became an important player and was made team captain in February 2014. He left the club after his contract expired at the end of the 2014–15 season. On 26 May, it was announced that he will be released and Kotev was not included in the squad for the 2015 Bulgarian Cup Final.

On 24 June 2015, Kotev signed a 1-year contract with his old club Lokomotiv Plovdiv. He was released on 15 June 2017 and publicly expressed his disappointment regarding the late announcement of the club's decision.

On 7 July 2017 he joined CSKA 1948 in the Bulgarian Third League.

On 12 June 2018, Kotev was appointed as sporting director of CSKA 1948 which marked his retirement as footballer.

International career
He was part of the Bulgarian 2004 European Football Championship team, which exited in the first round, finishing bottom of Group C, having finished top of Qualifying Group 8 in the pre-tournament phase.

Chinese League career statistics
(Correct as of 1 March 2012)

Honours
Lokomotiv Plovdiv
 A Group: 2003–04
 Bulgarian Supercup: 2004

CSKA Sofia
 A Group: 2007–08
 Bulgarian Cup: 2005–06
 Bulgarian Supercup (2): 2006, 2008

Dalian Aerbin
China League One: 2011

References

External links

1982 births
Living people
Footballers from Sofia
Bulgarian footballers
First Professional Football League (Bulgaria) players
PFC Velbazhd Kyustendil players
PFC Vidima-Rakovski Sevlievo players
PFC Lokomotiv Plovdiv players
PFC CSKA Sofia players
PFC Cherno More Varna players
FC CSKA 1948 Sofia players
Bulgarian expatriate footballers
Bulgarian expatriate sportspeople in China
Expatriate footballers in China
Dalian Professional F.C. players
China League One players
UEFA Euro 2004 players
Bulgaria international footballers
Association football defenders